Polly Devlin OBE (born 1944) is a writer and Irish broadcaster.

Biography 
She was born in Ardboe, County Tyrone, Northern Ireland, then a remote area without telephones or electricity. She left for London after winning the Vogue magazine Talent competition, working there as Features Editor.

She also wrote a column for the New Statesman and she had her own page in the Evening Standard a year later.  She moved to Manhattan in 1967 becoming a features editor and writer for Diana Vreeland on American Vogue.  She reviewed theatre and film and interviewed Barbra Streisand, Janis Joplin, John Lennon, John Osborne, Bob Dylan and Andy Warhol among many others. When she moved back to England, she attended the National Film School for four years and directed a one-hour documentary The Daisy Chain. She also wrote for The Observer, The Sunday Times, Vogue, and many other newspapers and magazines.

She has been a Booker Prize judge (1984), Irish Times Literary Award judge (1994), Pushkin Prize judge (1998) and was awarded the OBE for Services to Literature in the 1992 Birthday Honours.

She currently writes a column for The Big Issue and is Adjunct Professor at Barnard College Columbia University, New York teaching creative non-fiction. She is also Northern Ireland panel member on BBC Radio 4 Round Britain Quiz

She has five sisters and one brother, Barry Devlin who is bass player and vocalist in the Irish Celtic rock band Horslips. Her sister Marie is an editor and writer (Over Nine Waves, a collection of Irish myths and legends) who married the Nobel Laureate Seamus Heaney. In 1967 Polly married Andy Garnett an industrialist, philanthropist and writer of books including Steel Wheels, A Social History of Railways and Lucky Dog, a memoir. Together they had three daughters Rose Garnett, Head of Development at Film 4, Daisy Garnett writer and journalist and Bay Garnett fashion stylist, author and editor.

Books
 All of us There a social history.  Many re-prints.  Latest Virago Modern Classics
 The Far side of the Lough Short stories.  Re-published O'Brien Press 1999
 Vogue Book of Fashion Photography. Thames and Hudson. 1979
 Dora or the Shifts of the Heart a novel pub 1993 Chatto and Windus. Serialised for 13 weeks on Radio 4
 Dublin a Guide Book 1996
 Only Sometimes Looking Sideways A Book of Essays. O'Brien Press 1998
 A Year in the Life of an English Meadow Frances Lincoln 2007
 A Guide to Ceramics for the National Gallery Ireland
New York: Places to Write Home About Pimpernel Press 2017
New York:Behind Closed Doors: Gibbs-Smith. USA 2017
 Writing Home Essays. 2019

 Film: The Daisy Chain A documentary film: director and writer.
 Radio Play: The Hiring Fair

References

External links
 
 Article

1944 births
Living people
Officers of the Order of the British Empire
People from Ardboe